Comeback Story may refer to:

"Comeback Story", a song by Kings of Leon on their 2013 album Mechanical Bull
The Comeback Story, a 1953 American reality television series